Richard A. Colla (born April 18, 1936) (sometimes credited as Dick Colla) is an American film, television director and actor.

On screen he played Tony Merritt on the soap opera Days of Our Lives. His directorial credits include The Virginian, Battlestar Galactica, McCloud, Miami Vice, MacGyver, Hunter; Murder, She Wrote; Gunsmoke, Ironside; Trapper John, M.D.; and other series.

He directed the feature films Olly Olly Oxen Free (1978) starring Katharine Hepburn and Fuzz (1972) starring Burt Reynolds and Zig Zag (1970) starring George Kennedy. He was originally under consideration to direct the film Sometimes a Great Notion (1971) but was replaced by the film's star Paul Newman.

For much of the 1990s, he directed a number of television films his last credit being Growing Up Brady (2000).

Filmography
 Zig Zag (1970)
 Fuzz (1972)
 The Questor Tapes (1974)
 Live Again, Die Again (1974)
 The UFO Incident (1975)
 Battlestar Galactica (1978)
 Olly Olly Oxen Free (1978)
 Don't Look Back: The Story of Leroy 'Satchel' Paige (1981)
 Something Is Out There (1988)
 Blind Witness (1989)
 Desperate Rescue: The Cathy Mahone Story (1993)
 Web of Deception (1994)
 Love's Deadly Triangle: The Texas Cadet Murder (1997)
 Ultimate Deception (1999)
 Blue Valley Songbird (1999)
 Growing Up Brady (2000)

References

External links
 
 
 Richard A. Colla at BattlestarWiki.org

1936 births
Living people
American film directors
American male soap opera actors
American television directors
Place of birth missing (living people)